Kardaritsi is a mountain village in the municipal unit of Kontovazaina in northwest Arcadia, Greece. It is situated on a ridge above the left bank of the river Erymanthos. It is 5 km northwest of Kontovazaina, 6 km southeast of Lampeia (Divry), 9 km southwest of Psofida (Tripotama) and 50 km south of Patras. Historical records trace the existence of the village back to the 18th century. The village has a church dedicated to Saint Nicholas and an impressive cold water spring named “Trani Vrisi” that feeds the village's reservoir.

Population

References

External links
Η Ιστορία ενός χωριού – Καρδαρίτσι – Village History (Greek)
Kardaritsi Homes and Families – Καρδαρίτσι Σπίτια και Οικογένειες (in Greek) 
Kardaritsi Locations and Places – Καρδαρίτσι Τοπωνυμίες (in Greek) 
arcadia.ceid.upatras.gr/arkadia/places/kardaritsi.htm (in Greek)

Populated places in Arcadia, Peloponnese